Falsuszafrona belkisae is a species of sea snail, a marine gastropod mollusk in the family Columbellidae, the dove snails.

Description

Distribution
This marine species occurs off Guadeloupe.

References

 Pelorce J. (2020). Les Columbellidae collectés dans les eaux profondes autour de l'île de Guadeloupe (Antilles Françaises) pendant la campagne KARUBENTHOS 2 (2015) du Muséum National d'Histoire Naturelle. Iberus. 38(1): 55–111.

External links
 Espinosa, J.; Ortea, J.; Fernandez-Garcés, R.; Moro, L. (2007). Adiciones a la fauna de moluscos marinos de la peninsula de Guanahacabibes (I), con la descripcion de nuevas especies. Avicennia. 19, 63–88

Columbellidae
Gastropods described in 2007